Party is a 2018 Indian Marathi language comedy drama film directed by Sachin Darekar. The film stars Suvrat Joshi, Vedant Patil, Akshay Tanksale, Prajakta Mali, Stavan Shinde Rohit Haldikar and Manjiri Pupala in the lead roles. It was released on 7 September 2018.

Cast 
 Suvrat Joshi as Omkar
 Akshay Tanksale as Chakarya
 Prajakta Mali as Arpita
 Stavan Shinde as Sumeet
 Rohit Haldikar as Manya
 Sandesh Upashyam as Shashi
 Manjiri Pupala as Deepali
 Rajendra Shisatkar as Bhau Bhoir
 Falguni Rajani as Varsha Bhabhi
 Rajesh Deshpande
 Milind Phatak
 Suruchi Singh
 Bharat Sawle
 Pratap Kalke
 Umesh Damle
 Abha Velankar
 Madhavi Juvekar
 Ravi Mulve
 Varsha Dandale
 Ramesh Wani
 Mrunali Tambadkar
 Smita Apte

References

External links 
 

2018 films
Indian comedy-drama films
2018 comedy-drama films
2010s Marathi-language films